Chunshen Road is an above-ground station on Line 5 of the Shanghai Metro. Located at the intersection of Humin Highway and Chunshen Road in the city's Minhang District, the station opened with the rest of the first phase of Line 5 on 25 November 2003. Since 26 December 2020, both the main and the branch line trains run all the way to Xinzhuang with no shuttle service.

History 

Until 2018, the station platforms could accommodate only four-car trains. This work was completed by May 2018.

Description 
Chunshen Road is an above-ground metro station located at the intersection of Humin Highway and Chunshen Road, in the Minhang District of Shanghai.

This is because six-car trains are being run on the portion between Xinzhuang and Dongchuan Road, while four-car trains are run on the section between Dongchuan Road and Minhang Development Zone, which cannot accommodate longer trains.

Previously, prior to the opening of the Line 5 extension, and with service provided by four-car trains, trains which served this station would stop at all destinations on Line 5.

Once the extension of Line 5 opens, all trains which stop at Chunshen Road station will be six-car trains that serve the main line between Xinzhuang and Fengxian Xincheng. Passengers wishing to access stations on the branch line of Line 5 must transfer at Dongchuan Road. In the second half of 2019, both four-car and six-car trains will run together in the combined segment between Xinzhuang and Dongchuan Road, thus re-allowing passengers to travel to all destinations on Line 5 from Chunshen Road without transferring vehicles.

The station is fully accessible. Within the fare-paid zone, there are two elevators which connect the ground level with each of the two platforms.

Exits 
There is one station exit:
 Exit 1: Humin Highway

References

Railway stations in Shanghai
Line 5, Shanghai Metro
Shanghai Metro stations in Minhang District
Railway stations in China opened in 2003